Gertrude the Great, OSB (or Saint Gertrude of Helfta; , , ; January 6, 1256 – November 17, 1302) was a German Benedictine nun and mystic. She is recognized as a saint by the Catholic Church and figures in the General Roman Calendar on November 16 for optional celebration as a memorial throughout the Roman Rite.

In recent times the Episcopal Church has added Gertude to the Episcopal Calendar of Saints on November 21.

Life
Little is known of the early life of Gertrude who was born on the Feast of the Epiphany, January 6, 1256, in Eisleben, Thuringia (within the Holy Roman Empire). At age four, she entered the monastery school at St. Mary at Helfta (variously described both as Benedictine and as Cistercian), under the direction of its abbess, Gertrude of Hackeborn. It is speculated that her devout parents offered her as a child oblate to the church. However, given that Gertrude implies in the Herald that her parents were long dead at the time of writing, it is also possible that she entered the monastery school as an orphan.

Gertrude was entrusted to the care of Mechtilde, younger sister of the Abbess Gertrude, and joined the monastic community in 1266. It is clear from her own writings that she received a thorough education in a range of subjects. She, and the nun who authored Books 1 and 3-5 of the Herald, are thoroughly familiar with scripture, the Church Fathers such as Augustine of Hippo and Gregory the Great, and also more contemporary spiritual writers such as Richard and Hugh of St. Victor, William of St Thierry, and Bernard of Clairvaux. Moreover, Gertrude's writing demonstrates that she was well-versed in rhetoric, and her Latin is very fluent.

In 1281, at age 25, she experienced the first of a series of visions that continued for the rest of her days, and which changed the course of her life. Her priorities shifted away from secular knowledge and toward the study of scripture and theology. Gertrude devoted herself strongly to personal prayer and meditation, and began writing spiritual treatises for the benefit of her fellow nuns. Gertrude became one of the great mystics of the 13th century. Together with her friend and teacher Mechtilde, she practiced a spirituality called "nuptial mysticism," that is, she came to see herself as the Bride of Christ.

Gertrude died at Helfta, near Eisleben, Saxony, around 1302. Her feast day is celebrated on November 16, but the exact date of her death is unknown; the November date stems from a confusion with Abbess Gertrude of Hackeborn. One of her biographers, Gasparo Antonio Campaccio, diligently produced his own ‘Discorso Cronologico’ (pp 154–160) on her life, stating that the exact date of her death was November 17, 1334.

Works

Gertrude produced numerous writings, though only some survive today. The longest survival is the Legatus Memorialis Abundantiae Divinae Pietatis (known in English today as The Herald of Divine Love or The Herald of God's Loving-Kindness, and sometimes previously known as Life and Revelations), partly written by other nuns. There also remains her collection of Spiritual Exercises. A work known as Preces Gertrudianae (Gertrudian Prayers) is a later compilation, made up partly of extracts from the writings of Gertrude and partly of prayers composed in her style. It is also very possible that Gertrude was the author of a part of the revelations of Mechthild of Hackeborn, the Book of Special Grace.

The Herald is composed of five books. Book 2 forms the core of the work, and was written by Gertrude herself; she states that she began the work on Maundy Thursday, 1289. Books 3, 4, and 5 were written by another nun, or possibly by more than one, during Gertrude's lifetime and probably at least in part at her dictation. Book 1 was written shortly before or after Gertrude's death as an introduction to the whole collection; it is possible it was written by Gertrude's confessor, but more probably by another Helfta nun.

The importance of the Spiritual Exercises extends to the present day because they are grounded in the themes and rites of Catholic liturgy for occasions such as baptism, conversion, commitment, discipleship, union with God, praise of God, and preparation for death. Gertrude's Spiritual Exercises can still be used by anyone who seeks to deepen spirituality through prayer and meditation.

Devotion to the Sacred Heart

One of the most esteemed women saints of the Christian West, she was a notable early devotee of the Sacred Heart of Jesus. Book 2 of the Herald of Divine Love is notable within the history of Christian devotion because its vivid descriptions of Gertrude's visions show a considerable elaboration on the long-standing but ill-defined veneration of Christ's heart. This veneration was present in the belief that Christ's heart poured forth a redemptive fountain through the wound in his side, an image culminating in its most famous articulation by Bernard of Clairvaux in his commentary on the Song of Songs. The women of Helfta—Gertrude foremost, who surely knew Bernard's commentary, and to a somewhat lesser extent the two Mechthilds, Mechthild of Magdeburg and Mechthild of Hackeborn—made this devotion central to their mystical visions. Gertrude reported a vision on the Feast of John the Evangelist. She was resting her head near the wound in the Christ's side and hearing the beating of his heart. She asked John if on the night of the Last Supper he had felt these pulsations, why he had never spoken of the fact. John replied that this revelation had been reserved for subsequent ages when the world, having grown cold, would have need of it to rekindle its love.

Later reputation and influence
After her death, Gertrude's works seem to have vanished almost without trace. Only five manuscripts of the Herald have survived, the earliest one being written in 1412, and only two of these manuscripts are complete. With the invention of printing, Gertrude became far more prominent, with Latin, Italian and German editions being published in the sixteenth century. She was popular in seventeenth-century France, where her trust in and burning love for God were potent antidotes to Jansenism.

Philip Neri and Francis de Sales both used her prayers and recommended them to others.

In Spain, Bishop Diego of Tarragona, the confessor to Philip II, read the revelations of Gertrude aloud to the king as he lay dying in the Escorial.

Her works were also popular with the Discalced Carmelites in the sixteenth century. Francisco Ribera, the confessor to Teresa of Ávila, recommended that she take Gertrude as spiritual mistress and guide. At the height of Spanish female mysticism, the Spanish Jesuit Alonso de Andrade published a biography of Gertrude, giving Teresa a clear medieval antecedent.

More recently, Dom Prosper Guéranger, the restorer of Benedictine monasticism in France, was influenced by Gertrude. His Congregation of Solesmes was responsible for most of the work done on Gertrude in the nineteenth century.

Veneration

Gertrude was never solemnly canonized, but a liturgical office of prayer, readings, and hymns in her honor was approved by Rome in 1606, considered the equivalent of a canonization. The feastday of Saint Gertrude was extended to the Latin Church by Pope Clement XII and is nowadays celebrated on November 16, her presumed dies natalis, or date of death. Some religious communities, including some Benedictines, celebrate her liturgically on November 17, which had originally been chosen, but was already occupied by Gregory Thaumaturgus. It is said that Benedict XIV deemed it unfitting for him to be unseated by a woman. In the event, the Pope established November 15 as the date for Gertrude, since become November 16. Pope Benedict XIV gave her the title "the Great" to distinguish her from Gertrude of Hackeborn and to recognize the depth of her spiritual and theological insight.

In 2022, The Episcopal Church of the United States added Gertrude, along with Mechtilde, to its calendar of saints with a feast day on November 21.

Gertrude showed "tender sympathy towards the souls in Purgatory" and urged prayers for them. She is therefore invoked in aid of the suffering souls in Purgatory. The following prayer is attributed to Gertrude, and is often depicted on her prayer card:

Perhaps for that reason, her name has been attached to a prayer that, according to a legend of uncertain origin and date (neither are found in the Revelations of Saint Gertrude the Great), Christ promised to release a thousand souls from Purgatory each time it was said; despite the fact that practices relative to alleged promises to free one or more souls from Purgatory by the recitation of some particular prayer were prohibited by Pope Leo XIII. Nonetheless, the material that is found in her Revelations, such as the celebration of Gregorian Masses for the departed, reflects the devotions approved by the Catholic Church.

Iconography 
Images of Gertrude often show her gazing up to heaven, clothed as a nun with the ample sleeves typical of the choir habit. In the Baroque period it became a widespread artistic practice for the habit to be clearly depicted as that of a Benedictine, though this detail is not historically certain. At times she is also shown as an abbess, carrying a copy of the Rule of St Benedict in one hand and often also a crosier in the other hand. This latter detail is certainly mistaken and arose from confusing Gertrude the Great with Gertrude of Hackeborn, the abbess of St Mary at Helfta. Other artistic attributes distinguishing images of Gertrude are commonly a cross held in her hand  and on occasion a heart in the other. Sometimes the heart is displayed on her breast, surrounded by golden rays, and containing within it either a cross, or an image of the Sacred Heart of Jesus or a small figure of the Child Jesus.

Patronage
In compliance with a petition from King Philip IV of Spain she was declared Patroness of the West Indies; in Peru her feast is celebrated with great pomp, and in New Mexico the town Santa Gertrudis de lo de Mora was built in her honor and bears her name.

Legacy

The Monastery of St. Gertrude in Cottonwood, Idaho, is home to a community of some 50 professed Benedictine nuns.
Parishes are dedicated to Saint Gertrude in Washington, Missouri; Cincinnati, Ohio; Kingsville, Texas;  Woodstock, New Brunswick, Canada; Franklin Park, Illinois; Vandergrift, Pennsylvania; and Chicago, Illinois.
St. Gertrude High School is a Catholic college preparatory day school for young women in grades 9–12 in Richmond, Virginia.
Saint Gertrude Church in Firies, Killarney, County Kerry,  Ireland.
Saint Gertrude the Great Catholic School (TK-8th Grade) and Parish in Bell Gardens, California.

Church of St. Gertrude, Kaunas, Lithuania.

See also
Christian mystics
Saint Mechtilde of Hackeborn
Blessed Mary of the Divine Heart

Notes

References
Gertrude of Helfta, The Herald of Divine Love, translated and edited by Margaret Winkworth, introduced by Sister Maximilian Marnau, preface by Louis Bouyer. Classics of Western Spirituality. (New York: Paulist Press, 1993) [This contains a full translation of Books 1 and 2, and a partial translation of Book 3.]

Further reading
Gertrude the Great of Helfta, Spiritual Exercises, Translated, with an Introduction, by Gertrud Jaron Lewis and Jack Lewis. Cistercian Fathers series no. 49, (Kalamazoo: Cistercian Publications, 1989)
Gertrud the Great of Helfta, The Herald of God's Loving-Kindness, books 1 and 2, translated, with an Introduction, by Alexandra Barratt. Cistercian Fathers series no. 35, (Kalamazoo, MI: Cistercian Publications, 1991)
Gertrud the Great of Helfta, The Herald of God's Loving-Kindness, book 3, translated, with an Introduction, by Alexandra Barratt. Cistercian Fathers series no. 63, (Kalamazoo, MI: Cistercian Publications, 1999)

External links
 Benedict XVI, "On St. Gertrude", General audience, October 6, 2010
 The Life and Revelations of Saint Gertrude the Great - the full text online.
 Dolan, Gilbert. St. Gertrude the Great, Sands & Co., London, 1913
 St. Gertrude of Helfta at the Christian Iconography web site.

1256 births
1302 deaths
13th-century Christian mystics
13th-century Christian saints
13th-century German women writers
14th-century Christian mystics
14th-century Christian saints
14th-century German women writers
Female saints of medieval Germany
German Benedictines
German Christian mystics
German Roman Catholic saints
Medieval German saints
Rhineland mystics
Roman Catholic mystics
Women mystics
14th-century Latin writers
13th-century Latin writers